Jean Pierre Brol (born December 18, 1982) is a Guatemalan sport-shooter. He won gold for shooting at the 2011 Pan American Games in Men's trap and competed in the 2012 Summer Olympics, in the men's trap event.  He finished in 28th place.

References

External links
 

1982 births
Living people
Guatemalan male sport shooters
Trap and double trap shooters
Shooters at the 2003 Pan American Games
Shooters at the 2011 Pan American Games
Pan American Games gold medalists for Guatemala
Shooters at the 2012 Summer Olympics
Olympic shooters of Guatemala
Pan American Games medalists in shooting
Shooters at the 2015 Pan American Games
Central American and Caribbean Games gold medalists for Guatemala
Central American and Caribbean Games silver medalists for Guatemala
Central American and Caribbean Games bronze medalists for Guatemala
Competitors at the 2002 Central American and Caribbean Games
Competitors at the 2006 Central American and Caribbean Games
Competitors at the 2010 Central American and Caribbean Games
Central American and Caribbean Games medalists in shooting
Medalists at the 2011 Pan American Games